The National Protection War, also known as the Anti-Monarchy War, was a civil war that took place in China between 1915 and 1916. Only three years earlier, the last Chinese dynasty, the Qing dynasty, had been overthrown and the Republic of China was established in its place. The cause of the war was the proclamation by Yuan Shikai, the President of the Republic, of himself as the Hongxian Emperor, Emperor of the Empire of China. 

In Yunnan province, military leaders, including Tang Jiyao, Cai E and Li Liejun, declared their independence and launched military expeditions against Yuan Shikai. Yuan's army experienced several defeats and fractured, which led other provinces in the south to declare independence as well. Eventually, under immense pressure from the entire nation, Yuan Shikai was forced to abdicate. He resumed his rule as President and died a few months later.

Origin 
After Yuan Shikai plotted the assassinations of Song Jiaoren and Chen Qimei, founders of the Kuomintang, Sun Yat-sen launched the Second Revolution against him. It was unsuccessful, and Sun Yat-sen was forced to flee to Japan while the Kuomintang was dissolved. Between August and December 1915 supporters of Yuan began to clamor for the restoration of a Chinese monarchy. Yuan declared himself emperor of the his new Chinese Empire under the name Hongxian Emperor. The new empire was due to formally launch on 1 January 1916, when he intended to conduct the accession rites.

Process 
Shortly after Yuan Shikai proclaimed himself the Hongxian Emperor, Cai E and Tang Jiyao rulers of Yunnan province declared independence in the provincial capital, Kunming. The date was 25 December 1915. They organized the National Protection Army and began a military expedition against Yuan Shikai and his supporters to defeat the new Imperial China, and save the Republic of China. The Hongxian Emperor sent 80,000 men in an attempt to attack Yunnan, but his troops suffered a major defeat in Sichuan province. Before this defeat, Guizhou and Guangxi provinces declared their independence between February and March 1916. Guangdong, Shandong, Hunan, Shanxi, Jiangxi and Jiangsu followed suit and declared their independence shortly thereafter. Discord began to surface even inside the emperor's government in the national capital of Beijing. Faced with mounting pressure, Yuan Shikai was forced to abdicate on 22 March 1916, but he returned to his office of president and the war continued. He died soon after, on 6 June 1916. Eight days after his death, on 14 July 1916, the National Protection War was ended, with the provinces rescinding their declarations of independence. The independent provinces were controlled by warlords though, and so the Warlord Era began.

Northwest China 
The governor of Xinjiang, Yang Zengxin, was a former Qing dynasty official who approved of the Hongxian Emperor's monarchism and was against republicanism. Yang commanded thousands of Chinese Muslim troops. He ruled Xinjiang with a clique of Yunnanese, being from Yunnan himself. His subordinate Muslim generals Ma Fuxing and Ma Shaowu were also Yunnanese. When some of the Yunnanese revolutionaries wanted to join Cai E in rebelling against Yuan Shikai, he beheaded them at a New Year's banquet in 1916.

Taiwan 
Han Chinese and Aboriginal rebels launched the Tapani incident uprising against Japanese rule in 1915 with the rebel leader Yu Qingfang telling people that Yuan Shikai's Beiyang army would come and help liberate Taiwan from the Japanese. The rebellion was ruthlessly crushed by Japanese authorities within weeks of the initial uprising.

Influence 

The National Protection War symbolized the beginning of the separation between the North and the South after the establishment of the Republic of China. Yuan Shikai was a legitimate president of the Republic, but his attempt to become Emperor was thwarted by the military opposition of the southern provinces. Even after the end of Yuan's short-lived monarchy, the Beiyang government in Beijing was no longer able to maintain control over the military leaders of the southern provinces. After the death of Yuan, the Beiyang government lost its leadership over warlords in the provinces and infighting among cliques within the government began in earnest; meanwhile, Sun Yat-sen of the Kuomintang created a military government in Guangzhou in the far south, leading to the protection of the Constitution.

China's Warlord Era would last for years until Chiang Kai-shek unified the country through the Northern Expedition, the Central Plains War and many other civil wars before the onset of the Second Sino-Japanese War and Chinese Civil War.

References 

Fairbank, John King; Twitchett, Denis (1983). The Cambridge History of China: Republican China 1912–1949, Part 1. Cambridge University Press. .
Putnam Weale, Bertram Lenox (1917). The fight for the Republic in China. Dodd, Mead and Company. pp. 490. 

Conflicts in 1915
Conflicts in 1916
Wars involving the Republic of China
Warlord Era
1915 in China
1916 in China
Military history of Yunnan
Empire of China (1915–1916)